Kambadahalli Hanumappa Muniyappa (born 7 March 1948) is an Indian politician who was the Minister of State for Independent charge of Micro, Small and Medium Enterprises of India and a Member of Parliament in the Lok Sabha representing Kolar Lok Sabha constituency of Karnataka from 1991 to 2019.  He is a member of the Indian National Congress (INC) political party.

Political career
He belongs to Madiga (Sakkiliar) community.

Muniyappa has represented Kolar seven times consecutively: (10th Lok Sabha, 11th Lok Sabha, 12th Lok Sabha, 13th Lok Sabha, 14th Lok Sabha, 15th Lok Sabha and 16th Lok Sabha). He lost the 2019 elections to a largely unknown face S. Muniswamy by more than one lakh votes. Muniyappa blamed his own partymen for his defeat. He said his party's legislators worked against him, resulting in his defeat.

Muniyappa  was the Union Minister of state for  Minister of Micro, Small and Medium Enterprises. He was administered the oath of office along with 59 other ministers on 28 May 2009 by President of India Pratibha Patil.

Degrees and posts held

1969 onwards	Vice-Convenor, Congress (I) Scheduled Castes (SC) and Scheduled Tribes (ST) Cell, District. Kolar, Karnataka.

1978-83	Vice-President, Taluk Development Board, Sidlaghatta, District. Kolar, Karnataka.

1991	Elected to 10th Lok Sabha

	Member, Pradesh Congress Committee (P.C.C.) (I), Legal Cell, Karnataka

	Member, Executive Committee, P.C.C. (I) SC and ST Cell, Karnataka

	Vice-President, Taluk Congress (I) Committee, Sidlaghatta, District. Kolar, Karnataka

	Member, District Congress Committee (D.C.C.) (I), Dist. Kolar, Karnataka

	Member, Food and Civil Supplies (Eradication of Adulteration Committee), District. Kolar, Karnataka

1994	Joint Secretary, All India Congress Committee (A.I.C.C.)

1996	Re-elected to 11th Lok Sabha (2nd term)

1996-97	Member, Committee on Industry

	Member, Committee on Subordinate Legislation

	Member, Consultative Committee, Ministry of Welfare

1998	Re-elected to 12th Lok Sabha (3rd term)

1998-99	Member, Committee on Industry

	Member, Consultative Committee, Ministry of Social Justice and Empowerment

	Special Invitee, Consultative Committee, Ministry of Steel and Mines

1999	Re-elected to 13th Lok Sabha (4th term)
 
1999-2000	Member, Committee on Industry

2004	Re-elected to 14th Lok Sabha(5th term)

23 May 2004 onwards	Union Minister of State, Ministry of Shipping, Road Transport & Highways

2009	Re-elected to 15th Lok Sabha (6th term)

2009 - 28 Oct. 2012	Union Minister of State, Railways

28 Oct. 2012	Union Minister of State (Independent Charge), Micro, Small and Medium Enterprises

2014    Re-elected to 16th Lok Sabha (7th term)

Awards
Honorary Doctorate
 Honorary Doctorate - 32nd Annual Convocation of Gulbarga University (2014)

References

External links
Official Website: Shri K.H. Muniyappa, www.khmuniyappa.org

1948 births
People from Kolar
Union ministers of state of India
Indian National Congress politicians from Karnataka
India MPs 1991–1996
India MPs 1996–1997
India MPs 1998–1999
India MPs 1999–2004
India MPs 2004–2009
India MPs 2009–2014
Living people
Lok Sabha members from Karnataka
India MPs 2014–2019